

 

Vernon Islands is a locality in the Northern Territory of Australia located over land and water in the Clarence Strait including the Vernon Islands and which is located about  north-east of the territory capital of Darwin.

The locality is bounded as follows: 
 The southern boundary and part of the eastern boundary is formed by the coastline of the mainland from Gunn Point in the west to Cape Hotham in the east,
 The eastern boundary across the strait is a line from Cape Hotham  running towards Muranapi Point on Melville Island,
 The western boundary is a line from Red Cliffe on Melville Island that runs towards Lee Point on the mainland and which intersects with a line running west from Gunn Point thereby enclosing a portion of the waters of the Beagle Gulf.

The locality’s name is derived from the Vernon Islands, the island group which is located within the boundary of the locality and which is the only land within the locality.  The official source advises that the island group was named in 1818 by Royal Navy officer, Phillip Parker King, after most probably Edward Venables-Vernon-Harcourt who was the Archbishop of York at the time.  Its boundaries and name were gazetted on 4 April 2007. 

Human activity within the locality involves the passage of coastal shipping between Beagle Gulf and Van Diemen Gulf, recreational fishing and diving and cultural activities carried out by the Tiwi, Larrakia and Wulna peoples.  The Vernon Islands and Knight Reef, a reef to the north-east of the island group, have been gazetted as a protected area since 1974 and which has been known as the Vernon Islands Conservation Reserve since 1979.

The locality includes Henry Ellis Reef which lies within the triangle formed by the southern extremity of East Vernon Island, western extremity of North West Vernon Island and the north-east extremity of South West Vernon Island. It was named for the barque Henry Ellis, Captain Thomas Phillips, which ran aground there in June 1864.

The 2016 Australian census which was conducted in August 2016 reports that Vernon Islands had no people living within its boundaries.

Vernon Islands is located within the federal division of Lingiari, the territory electoral division of Nelson and the unincorporated areas of the Northern Territory.

References

Notes

Citations

Places in the unincorporated areas of the Northern Territory